The N7 is a national route in South Africa that runs from Cape Town northwards through the West Coast and Namaqualand regions to the Namibian border at Vioolsdrif. After crossing the border, it changes designation to B1 and runs north through Windhoek and the north of Namibia.

The N7 National Route forms the first section of the Tripoli-Cape Town Highway, which is a proposed link between Tripoli, the capital city of Libya, and Cape Town being developed by the United Nations Economic Commission for Africa (UNECA), the African Development Bank (AfDB) and the African Union.

Route
The N7 begins at a four-way interchange with the N1 National Route in Cape Town, adjacent to Acacia Park. South of this interchange, it is the M7 Route of Cape Town.

The portion of the road within Cape Town is a freeway, but it loses limited-access freeway status shortly after exiting the urban limits at the M12 interchange (Malibongwe Drive). From here it remains a dual-carriageway until just after Malmesbury at the R45 intersection. The N7 gains limited-access freeway status again at the Melkbosstrand M19 interchange, which it carries through to Malmesbury after roadworks were completed in 2020. Thereafter, the N7 is a single-carriageway highway with wide paved shoulders to Piekenierskloof Pass and through the Olifants River valley until Clanwilliam.

The rest of the N7 to the Namibian border, through Vredendal and Springbok (where it meets the N14 National Route) is a single-carriageway highway with no paved shoulders.

After crossing into Namibia, it becomes the B1 road to Keetmanshoop and Windhoek.

Trans-African Highway Network

The N7 National Route forms the first section of the Tripoli-Cape Town Highway, which is a proposed link between Tripoli, the capital city of Libya, and Cape Town being developed by the United Nations Economic Commission for Africa (UNECA), the African Development Bank (AfDB) and the African Union.

References

External links

 National Roads Agency SA

Highways in South Africa
National Roads in South Africa
Roads in Cape Town
Roads in South Africa